Pitcairnia unilateralis is a species of plant in the family Bromeliaceae. It is endemic to Ecuador.  Its natural habitats are subtropical or tropical moist lowland forests and subtropical or tropical moist montane forests. The specific epithet, is derived from Latin and means "one-sided".

References

unilateralis
Endemic flora of Ecuador
Vulnerable plants
Taxonomy articles created by Polbot